Things Happen at Night is a 1947 British supernatural ghost comedy film directed by Francis Searle and starring Gordon Harker, Alfred Drayton, Robertson Hare and Garry Marsh. The film is based upon a stage play, The Poltergeist, by Frank Harvey. It was shot at Twickenham Studios. Despite the film's comparatively large budget it ended up being released as a second feature.

Plot summary 
An English country house is plagued by a poltergeist who destroys things in the home, rearranges pictures on the wall, and possesses the daughter of the owner causing her to be expelled from school. A psychic ghost breaker and an insurance agent help the homeowners battle and expel the spirit.

Cast 
Gordon Harker as Joe Harris
Alfred Drayton as Wilfred Prescott
Robertson Hare as Vincent Ebury
Gwynneth Vaughan as Audrey Prescott
Olga Lindo as Hilda Prescott
Garry Marsh as Spenser
Wylie Watson as Watson, the butler
Joan Young as Mrs. Venning, the cook
Beatrice Campbell as Joyce Prescott
Grace Denbigh Russell as Miss Hancock
Judith Warden as Mrs. Fortescue
June Elvin as Mabel Minter
Knox Crichton as Nobby Ebury
Eric Micklewood as Robert Ebury 
Charles Doe as Bill
Michael Callin as Mac
George Bryden as Freddie Simpson
Marilyn Williams as Singer
Peter Reynolds
Patricia Owens

References

Bibliography
 Chibnall, Steve & McFarlane, Brian. The British 'B' Film. Palgrave MacMillan, 2009.

External links 

1947 films
1940s comedy horror films
British comedy horror films
British black-and-white films
British films based on plays
Films shot at Southall Studios
Films shot at Twickenham Film Studios
1940s ghost films
1947 horror films
1947 comedy films
Films directed by Francis Searle
1940s English-language films
1940s British films